Sarita Sarvate is an Indian-American journalist and writer.  For nearly twenty years, she has published the “Last Word” column for India Currents, an Indian-American magazine.  She has also published opinion essays for New America Media, a coalition of ethnic media around the world and its predecessor the Pacific News Service, for over a decade.  Her opinion columns, essays, and book reviews have been syndicated in the Los Angeles Times, the San Jose Mercury News, the Oakland Tribune, Salon Magazine, Rediff News Service of India, and many other online and print media outlets.  She has been a leader in the South Asian community, speaking at various events, and has been written about in a profile of exceptional women in the South Asian immigrant women.  Her fiction has been published in an anthology of poetry and fiction by South Asian American writers.

Awards
In 1998, she won the award  for the best commentary in ethnic media from New California Media, a coalition of ethnic digital and print media that has since expanded to become the New America Media.  The following year, she won the second prize in the same category.

References

External links
 saritasarvate.com

American women journalists
Living people
Year of birth missing (living people)
21st-century American women